Antwerp (Amberes in Spanish) is a novella by the Chilean author Roberto Bolaño. It was written in 1980 but only published in 2002, a year before the author's death. An English translation by Natasha Wimmer was published in 2010.

Considered by Bolaño's literary executor Ignacio Echevarría to be the big bang of the Bolaño universe, the loose prose-poem novel was written when Bolaño was 27. Antwerp is short and fragmentary, composed of 56 pieces (which could be seen as vignettes or sketches) with a loose narrative structure. Though there are some recurring characters and story lines, there is no central narrative. Many of the subjects dealt with become Bolaño's common material for his other works of fiction - crimes and campgrounds, drifters and poetry, sex and love, corrupt cops and misfits.

Bolaño had once stated that "The only novel that doesn't embarrass me is Antwerp.". In the introduction he wrote for the book in 2002 Bolaño claimed:
"I wrote this book for myself, and even that I can't be sure of. For a long time these were just loose pages that I reread and maybe tinkered with, convinced I had no time. But time for what? I couldn't say exactly. I wrote this book for the ghosts, who, because they're outside of time, are the only ones with time."

References

External links
 Antwerp - New Directions Publishing's page for the book.
 Roberto Bolaño's Antwerp - review of the book on the Book Soup blog, 1 April 2010.
 Roberto Bolaño's Antwerp - review of the book on the Complete Review by M. A. Orthofer, 13 January 2010.
 Summer Reading: Roberto Bolaño's Antwerp - review of the book on The Smart Set by Morgan Meis, 23 July 2010.
 Tales by Chilean master of malaise - review of Monsieur Pain, The Return, The Insufferable Gaucho, and Antwerp  
 Antwerp by Roberto Bolaño: review - review of the book in The Daily Telegraph, 21 October 2011.

2002 Chilean novels
Works by Roberto Bolaño
Chilean novellas
Editorial Anagrama books